E-iginimpa'e was a Sumerian ruler (ensi) of the Mesopotamian city of Adab in the mid-3rd millennium BCE, probably circa 2400 BCE. He succeeded another ensi known as Mugsi.

He is known from several inscriptions, most of them located in the Oriental Institute Museum, Chicago, with one tablet in the State Hermitage Museum, Saint Petersburg. He was a contemporary of Lugal-zage-si as several land transactions are recorded between the two.

One of his tablets reads, dedicated to goddess Digirmah or Ensimah (equivalent of Martu) reads:

E-iginimpa'e was "ensi-GAR", the highest civil office in Adab.

References

Sumerian kings
25th-century BC Sumerian kings
Kings of Adab